Ingersoll station is a train station in Ingersoll, Ontario, Canada serving Via Rail. It is a stop for some trains operating between Toronto and Windsor; as of 2016, two trains stop at Ingersoll. The station is wheelchair accessible, and the shelter has a pay-phone and washrooms.

History
The station was originally built in 1886 by the Great Western Railway which was purchased in 1882 by the Grand Trunk Railway and merged into the Canadian National Railway in 1920.

The historic building was closed in 1979 when VIA took over train operation and a utilitarian wooden frame structure, containing a waiting room and washroom facilities, was built just to the east.

Being one of Ingersoll's few remaining significant historic buildings, it was in the municipal heritage inventory, but it was not designated under the Ontario Heritage Act. The building was boarded up and not been protected or restored. TIt was demolished at the bequest of Town of Ingersoll officials after many decades of neglect and decay.

It was referenced in Planning for Heritage Railway Stations: Inventory where it was described as follows: "The Ingersoll station was modelled after the Woodstock station and features a steeply pitched cross-gabled roof with overhang and large wooden brackets. The station is architecturally significant and is a very good example of the Gothic Revival style adapted for a smaller station. It was evaluated as Heritage Class B".

References

External links
Ingersoll train station

Via Rail stations in Ontario
Ingersoll, Ontario
Railway stations in Oxford County, Ontario
Great Western Railway stations
Canadian National Railway stations in Ontario